Frankie Pett Presents the Happy Submarines Playing the Music of Dead Voices On Air is a 2000 album by Dead Voices on Air.

Track listing

Credits
Mark Spybey - vocals, trumpet, toys, drums, keyboards, sampler, effects, composer, engineer, producer
Frank Verschuuren - engineer and producer (tracks 1, 2, 7, 11), composer (tracks 2, 7, 11)
Darryl Neudorf - engineer and producer (tracks 2, 3, 7), composer (tracks 2, 3, 4, 7), drums (track 4), guitar and bass (track 7)
Bert Van Hoorn - vocals and text (track 1)
Niels Van Hoorn - saxophone (track 7), voice sounds and flute (track 11), composer (tracks 7, 11)
Bradley Dunn-Klerxs - drums, composer (track 2)
Frankie Pett - vocals (track 4), mixing (track 11), co-producer, executive producer
Darren Phillips - keyboards, composer (track 4)
Michael Rother - recording (track 4)
Mark Nugent

References

2000 albums